The 1997 Missouri Valley Conference men's basketball tournament was played after the conclusion of the 1996–1997 regular season at the Kiel Center in St. Louis, Missouri.

The Illinois State Redbirds defeated the Southwest Missouri State Bears in the championship game, 75–72, and as a result won their 3rd MVC Tournament title and earned an automatic bid to the 1997 NCAA tournament. Rico Hill of Illinois State was named the tournament MVP.

Tournament Bracket

See also
 Missouri Valley Conference

References 

1996–97 Missouri Valley Conference men's basketball season
Missouri Valley Conference men's basketball tournament
1997 in sports in Missouri
College basketball tournaments in Missouri
Basketball competitions in St. Louis